"Prove Your Love" is a song recorded by American singer-songwriter and actress Taylor Dayne for her debut studio album, Tell It to My Heart (1988). Written by Seth Swirsky and Arnie Roman, and produced by Ric Wake, the song was released in 1988 as the album's second single, by Arista Records. The single was Dayne's second top 10 hit on the US Billboard Hot 100 chart, where it peaked at number seven. The single spent eleven weeks in the Top 40. It also appeared on the Dance Club Songs chart, where it became Dayne's first number-one hit on that chart on April 23, 1988. Furthermore, the single was a hit overseas, going to number-one in Switzerland, number four in West Germany, and number eight on the UK Singles chart.

Critical reception
Andrew Panos from Number One complimented "Prove Your Love" as "a thumpingly catchy disco tune".

Music video
Directed by Peter Lippman, the accompanying music video for "Prove Your Love" features Dayne riding around New York City in a convertible with her guitarist, Tommy Byrnes on their way to her rehearsal space in an almost empty warehouse. While co-hosting Rick Dees Weekly Top 40 early in her career, Taylor stated that Paula Abdul helped with the choreography of the video.

Track listing and formats
 7" single
 "Prove Your Love" — 3:25
 "Upon the Journey's End" — 4:03

 US 12" maxi
 "Prove Your Love" (Extended Remix) — 7:27
 "Prove Your Love" (Hot Single Mix) — 3:25
 "Prove Your Love" (Edited Remix) — 4:32
 "Prove Your Love" (Prove Your Dub/Beats Mix) — 8:30

 UK 12" maxi
 "Prove Your Love" (Extended Remix) — 7:27
 "Prove Your Love" (Prove Your Dub/Beats Mix) — 8:30
 "Upon the Journey's End" — 4:03

 Alternate UK 12" maxi
 "Prove Your Love" (House Mix) — 7:24
 "Tell It to My Heart" (House of Hearts Mix) — 8:34
 "Upon the Journey's End" — 4:03

Charts

Weekly charts

Year-end charts

References

The Billboard Book of Top 40 Hits, 6th Edition, 1996

External links
 

1988 singles
Taylor Dayne songs
Songs written by Seth Swirsky
Song recordings produced by Ric Wake
Songs written by Arnie Roman
1988 songs
Arista Records singles